Tannersville may refer to the following places in the United States:

 Tannersville, New York
 Tannersville, Pennsylvania
Tavennersville, West Virginia